The Geological Survey of Denmark and Greenland is the independent sector research institute under the Danish Ministry of Climate and Energy.  GEUS is an advisory, research and survey institute in hydrogeology, geophysics, geochemistry, stratigraphy, glaciology, ore geology, marine geology, mineralogy, climatology, environmental history, air photo interpretation, geothermal energy fields concerning Denmark and Greenland.

GEUS works in close corporation with Geologisk Institut and Geologisk Museum, both part of University of Copenhagen.

It publishes a service paper called Greenland Hydrocarbon Exploration Information Service  (GHEXIS) and a newsletter called Greenland Mineral Exploration Newsletter  (MINEX) in co-operation with the Bureau of Minerals and Petroleum (Råstofdirektoratet), a secretariat for the Joint Committee on Mineral Resources under Greenland's home rule.

History
In 1888  (DGU) was founded.

In 1946,  was created.

On 14 June 1965, law no. 238 created GGU.

On 23 December 1987, law no. 864 merged GGU into DGU, changing its name to DGGU.

On 14 June 1995, Law no. 408  disbanded law no. 238.

On 20 December 1995, law no. 1076 concerning Danish sector research institutes created GEUS by merging DGU and GGU.

See also
Geography of Denmark
Geography of Greenland
Gemstone industry in Greenland

External links
Geological Survey of Denmark and Greenland, official website
 Geological Survey of Denmark and Greenland Bulletin 

Environment of Denmark
Government agencies of Denmark
Research institutes in Denmark
Geology of Greenland
1995 establishments in Denmark
Earth science research institutes
Denmark and Greenland
Geology of Denmark